Howard High School may refer to:
 David T. Howard High School, a former high school in Atlanta, Georgia, U.S.
 Howard High School of Technology, in Wilmington, Delaware, U.S.
 Howard High School (Howard County, Maryland), in Ellicott City, Maryland, U.S.
 Howard High School (Macon, Georgia)
 Howard High School (Florida), a segregated high school in Ocala, Florida, closed in 1968.
 The former name of Marquette Senior High School, in Marquette, Michigan, U.S.
 Howard School of Academics and Technology

See also
 Howard School (disambiguation)